Mark Serjeant (born February 19, 1996) is a Canadian soccer player who plays for Western.

Career

College
Serjeant attended Grand Canyon University in 2014, and played for the Antelopes. During the season, he appeared in 19 games, starting in 10, and registered 1 assist. In 2010, he played with TFC Academy in the Second Division of the Canadian Soccer League.

Professional
Sarjeant signed with Toronto FC II on March 20, 2015. He made his debut for the team on March 28 against FC Montreal. Serjeant and TFCII mutually parted ways on August 18, 2015.

References

External links
 Grand Canyon Antelopes profile

1996 births
Living people
Canadian soccer players
Toronto FC players
Toronto FC II players
Association football midfielders
Soccer players from Toronto
USL Championship players
League1 Ontario players
Grand Canyon University alumni
Canadian Soccer League (1998–present) players
FC London players